Faecalibaculum is a Gram-positive, strictly anaerobic, non-spore-forming and non-motile genus from the family of Erysipelotrichidae with one known species (Faecalibaculum rodentium). Faecalibaculum rodentium has been isolated from the faeces of a laboratory mouse from Korea.

References 

Erysipelotrichia
Bacteria genera
Taxa described in 2016
Monotypic bacteria genera